Stuchowska Struga is a river of Poland, a tributary of the Świniec near Strzeżewo.

Rivers of Poland
Rivers of West Pomeranian Voivodeship